was a Russian language scholar and translator of Russian literature in Shōwa period Japan.

Biography
Born in Kyoto, Yuasa was an early supporter of the feminist movement in late Taishō and early Shōwa period Japan. Moving to Tokyo, she was also drawn to leftist political movements and became involved with leading female proletarian literature movement novelist Chūjō Yuriko. In 1924, after Chūjō divorced her husband, the two women began to live together, and from 1927–1930, traveled together to the Soviet Union, where they studied the Russian language and Russian literature and developed a friendship with noted movie director Sergei Eisenstein.

Evidence suggests that the relationship between Yuasa and Chūjō was a romantic if not sexual one. While Yuasa has also been romantically linked to writer Tamura Toshiko among others, Chūjō is said to have been the love of Yuasa's life. Yuasa was never again romantically linked to another woman after Chūjō's marriage to proletarian author and Japan Communist Party leader Miyamoto Kenji, although in an interview late in life Yuasa said that the word "lesbian" (rezubian/レズビアン) applied to her.

After their return to Japan and Chūjō remarried, Yuasa continued with her translation work of Russian authors, especially the works of Maxim Gorky, Anton Chekhov and Samuil Marshak. She is especially known for her translation of Chekhov's The Cherry Orchard. Yuasa died in 1990, and her grave is at Tōkei-ji, a temple in Kamakura.

Legacy
After her death, the Yuasa Yoshiko Prize was established for the best translation of a foreign language stage play into Japanese.

Portrayals
Yuriko, Dasvidaniya is a 2011 drama film, depicting a brief period in 1924, in which  Nahana plays Yuasa. Directed by Sachi Hamano, the film is based on two of Yuriko's autobiographical novels, Nobuko and Futatsu no niwa, and on Hitomi Sawabe's non-fiction novel Yuriko, dasuvidaniya: Yuasa Yoshiko no seishun.

See also
Japanese literature
List of Japanese authors

Notes

References

 沢部ひとみ (pseud. 広沢有美). 1987.「ダンディなロシア文学者湯浅芳子訪問記」in『女を愛する女たちの物語』（別冊宝島６４号）, 67-73. 東京：JICC出版局. (Sawabe Hitomi [pseud.; Hirosawa Yumi].  1987. "Dandi na Roshia bungakusha Yuasa Yoshiko hōmonki [A Record of a Visit with Dandy Russian Literature Scholar Yuasa Yoshiko]. In Onna wo ai suru onnatachi no monogatari [Stories of women who love women] [Bessatsu Takarajima, no. 64], 67-73. Tokyo: JICC Shuppankyoku.
 沢部ひとみ. 1990.『百合子、ダスヴィダーニヤ—湯浅芳子の青春』. 東京：女性文庫・学陽書房. (Sawabe Hitomi. 1990. Yuriko, dasuvidāniya: Yuasa Yoshiko no seishun (Yuriko, do svidanya: Yuasa Yoshiko's youth). Tokyo: Josei bunko / gakuyō shobō.
 Sawabe Hitomi. (1987) 2007. "A Visit with Yuasa Yoshiko, a Dandy Scholar of Russian Literature", trans. James Welker. In Queer Voices from Japan: First-Person Narratives from Japan's Sexual Minorities, ed. Mark McLelland, Katsuhiko Suganuma, and James Welker, 31-40. Lanham, Maryland: Lexington, 2007.
 湯浅芳子, 編. 1978. 『百合子の手紙』. 東京：筑摩書房.　(Yuasa Yoshiko, ed. 1978. Yuriko no tegami [Yuriko's letters]. Tokyo: Chikuma shobō.)

1896 births
1990 deaths
Writers from Kyoto
Japanese feminists
Japanese communists
Translators from Russian
Translators to Japanese
Marxist feminists
Socialist feminists
Communist women writers
20th-century Japanese translators
20th-century Japanese women writers
Japanese lesbian writers